How Long I've Kissed is a 2012 South Korean television series starring Kim Hee-ae, Lee Sung-jae, Lee Tae-ran and Jang Hyun-sung. It aired on JTBC from February 29 to April 19, 2012.

Synopsis
The story of a struggling housewife who starts having an affair with her younger neighbor.

Cast

Main
 Kim Hee-ae as Yoon Seo-rae
 Lee Sung-jae as Kim Tae-oh
 Lee Tae-ran as Hong Ji-sun
 Jang Hyun-sung as Han Sang-jin

Supporting
 Im Je-noh as Han-gyul
 Lee Jung-gil as Han Yong-hee
 Nam Yoon-jung as Jin Soo-ae
 Choi Eun-kyung as Han Myung-jin
 Park Hyuk-kwon as Jo Hyun-tae
 Lee Han-na as Jo Yoon-jae
 Lami as Jo Yoon-min
 Nam Neung-mi as Oh Jung-ae
 Jang So-yeon as Yoon Mi-rae
 Choi Da-in as Kim Bo-reum
 Lim Sung-min as Kang Eun-joo
 Castle J as Jo Jae-hoon
 Jung Han-yong as Jo Seok-ho
 Gil Hae-yeon as Ha Seom-jin
 Yook Mi-ra as Sung In-ok
 Hong Sung-sook as Min Hae-kyung
 Park Geun-hyung as Oh Young-sook
 Lee Sun-young as Lim Jung-ah
 Kim Shi-young as Cha Seung-hye
 Seo Jeong-yeon as Kim Hyun-hee

Ratings
In this table,  represent the lowest ratings and  represent the highest ratings.

Awards and nominations

References

External links
  
 
 
 Watch Drama Online

JTBC television dramas
Korean-language television shows
2012 South Korean television series debuts
2012 South Korean television series endings
South Korean romance television series
Adultery in television
Television series by Drama House